John Davies Cale  (born 9 March 1942) is a Welsh musician, composer, singer, songwriter and record producer who was a founding member of the American rock band the Velvet Underground. Over his six-decade career, Cale has worked in various styles across rock, drone, classical, avant-garde and electronic music.

He studied music at Goldsmiths College, University of London, before relocating in 1963 to New York City's downtown music scene, where he performed as part of the Theatre of Eternal Music and formed the Velvet Underground. Since leaving the band in 1968, Cale has released sixteen solo studio albums, including the widely acclaimed Paris 1919 (1973) and Music for a New Society (1982). Cale has also acquired a reputation as an adventurous record producer, working on the debut albums of several innovative artists, including the Stooges and Patti Smith.

Early life and career
John Davies Cale was born on 9 March 1942 in the mining village of Garnant in the valley of the River Amman in Carmarthenshire of Wales to Will Cale, a coal miner, and Margaret Davies, a primary school teacher. Although his father spoke only English, his mother spoke and taught Welsh to Cale, which hindered his relationship with his father, although he began learning English at primary school, at around the age of seven. Cale was molested by two different men during his youth: an Anglican priest who molested him in a church and a music teacher. He played organ at Ammanford church. The BBC recorded Cale playing a toccata he composed primarily on the black keys of the piano in the style of Aram Khachaturian. His mother was institutionalized for breast cancer when he was 11.

Having discovered a talent for viola, Cale joined the National Youth Orchestra of Wales at age 13. Receiving a scholarship, Cale studied music at Goldsmiths College, University of London. While he was there he organised an early Fluxus concert, A Little Festival of New Music, on 6 July 1964. He also contributed to the short film Police Car and had two scores published in Fluxus Preview Review (July 1963) for the nascent avant-garde collective. He conducted the first performance in the UK of Cage's Concert for Piano and Orchestra, with the composer and pianist Michael Garrett as soloist. In 1963, he travelled to the United States to continue his musical training with the assistance and influence of Aaron Copland.

Upon arriving in New York City, Cale met a number of influential composers. On 9 September 1963 he participated, along with John Cage and several others, in an 18-hour and 40 minute piano-playing marathon that was the first full-length performance of Erik Satie's "Vexations". After the performance Cale appeared on the television panel show I've Got a Secret. Cale's secret was that he had performed in an 18-hour concert, and he was accompanied by Karl Schenzer, whose secret was that he was the only member of the audience who had stayed for the duration. Cale would later attribute Cage's writings with his own "relaxed" artistic outlook, having hitherto been raised to believe that European composers were obliged to justify their work.

Cale played in La Monte Young's ensemble the Theatre of Eternal Music. The heavily drone-laden music he played there proved to be a big influence in his work with his next band, the Velvet Underground. One of his collaborators on these recordings was the Velvet Underground guitarist Sterling Morrison. Three albums of his early experimental work from this period were released in 2001.

The Velvet Underground (1964–1968)

Cale had enjoyed and followed rock music as well as avant-garde and European art music from a young age; on a visit to Britain in 1965, he procured records by the Kinks, the Who and Small Faces that remained unavailable in the United States.

Early that year, he co-founded the Velvet Underground with Lou Reed, recruiting his flatmate Angus MacLise and Reed's college friend Sterling Morrison to complete the initial line-up. Just before the band's first paying gig for $75 ($709 adjusted for 2022) at Summit High School in New Jersey, MacLise abruptly quit the band because he viewed accepting money for art as selling out; he was replaced by Moe Tucker as the band's drummer. Initially hired to play that one show, she soon became a permanent member and her tribal pounding style became an integral part of the band's music, despite the initial objections of Cale to the band having a female drummer.

On his aforementioned visit to Britain in the summer of 1965, Cale shopped a crudely recorded, acoustic-based Velvet Underground demo reel to several luminaries in the British rock scene (including Marianne Faithfull) with the intention of securing a recording contract. Although this failed to manifest, the tape was disseminated throughout the UK underground over the following eighteen months by such figures as producer Joe Boyd and Mick Farren of the Deviants. As a result, the Deviants, the Yardbirds and David Bowie had all covered Velvet Underground songs prior to the release of their debut studio album in 1967.

The very first commercially available recording of the Velvet Underground, an instrumental track called "Loop" given away with Aspen magazine, was a feedback experiment written and conducted by Cale. His creative relationship with Reed was integral to the sound of the Velvet Underground's first two studio albums, The Velvet Underground & Nico (recorded in 1966, released in 1967) and White Light/White Heat (recorded in 1967, released in 1968). On these albums he plays viola, bass guitar and piano, and sings occasional backing vocals. White Light/White Heat (1968) also features Cale on organ (on "Sister Ray") as well as two vocal performances: "Lady Godiva's Operation", an experimental song where he shares lead vocal duties with Reed, and "The Gift", a long spoken word piece written by Reed during his time at Syracuse University. Though Cale co-wrote the music to several songs, his most distinctive contribution is the electrically amplified viola. He also played celesta on "Sunday Morning". Cale also played on Nico's 1967 debut studio album, Chelsea Girl, which includes songs co-written by Velvet Underground members Cale, Reed and Morrison, who also appear as musicians. Cale makes his debut as lyricist on "Winter Song" "Wrap Your Troubles in Dreams", and "Little Sister".

Apart from appearing on the Velvet Underground's first two studio albums, he also played organ on the track "Ocean" during the practice sessions to produce demos for the band's fourth studio album Loaded (1970), nearly two years after he left the band. He was enticed back into the studio by the band's manager, Steve Sesnick, "in a half-hearted attempt to reunite old comrades", as Cale put it. Although he does not appear on the finished album, the demo recording of "Ocean" was included in the 1997 Loaded: Fully Loaded Edition CD re-issue. Finally, five previously unreleased tracks recorded in late 1967 and early 1968 were included on the compilation albums VU (1985) and Another View (1986).

With tensions between Reed and Cale growing, Reed gave an ultimatum to Morrison and Tucker, declaring that unless Cale was fired, he would quit the band. Morrison and Tucker reluctantly went along with the scheme.

In September 1968, Cale played his final gig with the Velvet Underground at the Boston Tea Party and according to Tucker, "When John left, it was really sad. I felt really bad. And of course, this was gonna really influence the music, 'cause, John's a lunatic (laughs). I think we became a little more normal, which was fine, it was good music, good songs, it was never the same though. It was good stuff, a lot of good songs, but, just, the lunacy factor was... gone." After his dismissal from the band, Cale was replaced by Boston-based musician Doug Yule, who played bass guitar, keyboards and who would soon share lead vocal duties in the band with Reed.

Michael Carlucci, who was friends with Robert Quine, has given this explanation about Cale's dismissal, "Lou told Quine that the reason why he had to get rid of Cale in the band was Cale's ideas were just too out there. Cale had some wacky ideas. He wanted to record the next album with the amplifiers underwater, and [Lou] just couldn't have it. He was trying to make the band more accessible."

Arguably, the artistic frictions between Cale and Reed are what shaped the band's early sound much more than any other members. The pair often had heated disagreements about the direction of the band, and this tension was central to their later collaborations. When Cale left, he seemed to take the more experimental tendencies with him, as is noticeable in comparing the proto-noise rock of White Light/White Heat (which Cale co-created) to the comparatively dulcet, folk rock–influenced The Velvet Underground (1969), recorded after his departure.

Cale has favorably compared the dissonance of his Velvet Underground compositions to the indecipherable lyricism of certain strains of Southern hip hop: "If I can use out-of-tune stuff, [rappers] don't need words to make sense. There's definitely a lineage".

Solo career

1970s
After leaving the Velvet Underground, Cale worked as a record producer and arranger on a number of studio albums, most notably the Stooges' highly influential 1969 self-titled debut and a trilogy by Nico, including The Marble Index (1968), Desertshore (1970) and The End... (1974). On these he accompanied Nico's voice and harmonium using a wide array of instruments to unusual effect. While meeting with Joe Boyd (who co-produced Desertshore), he came across Nick Drake's music and insisted on collaborating with the fledgling artist. He appeared on Drake's second studio album, Bryter Layter (1971), playing viola and harpsichord on "Fly" and piano, organ, and celesta on "Northern Sky".

In addition to working as a record producer, Cale initiated a solo recording career in early 1970. His debut studio album, Vintage Violence (1970), is a lushly produced roots rock effort indebted to a range of disparate influences, including the Band, Leonard Cohen, the Byrds, Phil Spector and Brian Wilson. The more experimental Church of Anthrax (a collaboration with minimal music pioneer Terry Riley) followed in February 1971, although it was actually recorded nearly a year prior to its release. While his explorations in art music briefly continued with 1972's The Academy in Peril, he would not compose in the classical mode thereafter until he began working on film soundtracks in the 1980s.

In 1972, he signed with au courant Reprise Records as a recording artist and staff producer. The Academy in Peril (1972) was his first project for Reprise. The subsequent Paris 1919 (1973) steered back towards the singer-songwriter mode of Vintage Violence (1970) with a backing band that included Lowell George of Little Feat and Wilton Felder of the Crusaders, as well as the UCLA Symphony Orchestra. Composed of highly melodic songs with arcane and complex lyrics, it has been cited by critics as one of his best.

While affiliated with the label, he produced studio albums by Jennifer Warnes (her third, Jennifer), Chunky, Novi & Ernie, and the self-titled debut of the Modern Lovers, which Reprise chose not to release; it subsequently appeared on Beserkley Records, the latest in a series of important Cale-produced proto-punk records. In 1974 he signed to Island Records as an artist, while continuing to produce a variety of artists, mostly for other labels, including Squeeze, Patti Smith and Sham 69. He worked as a talent scout with Island's A&R department.

1974–1979
In 1974, Cale moved back to London. As his second marriage began to dissolve, he made a series of solo studio albums which moved in a new direction. His records now featured a dark and threatening aura, often carrying a sense of barely suppressed aggression. A trilogy of studio albums – Fear (1974), Slow Dazzle (1975), and Helen of Troy (1975) – were rapidly recorded and released over the course of about a year with other Island artists, including Phil Manzanera and Brian Eno of Roxy Music and Chris Spedding, who played in his live band. A showpiece of his concerts from the era was his radically transformed cover version of Elvis Presley's "Heartbreak Hotel," initially performed by Cale on Slow Dazzle (1975) and the live album June 1, 1974, recorded with Kevin Ayers, Nico and Eno. Both "Leaving It Up to You" and "Fear Is a Man's Best Friend" (from Fear) begin as relatively conventional songs that gradually grow more paranoid in tone before breaking down into what critic Dave Thompson calls "a morass of discordance and screaming".

Cale released Animal Justice in 1977, an EP notable particularly for the epic "Hedda Gabler", based very loosely on the play of the same name by Henrik Ibsen. His loud, abrasive and confrontational live performances fitted well with the punk rock scene developing on both sides of the Atlantic Ocean. Cale took to wearing a hockey goaltender mask onstage (as evinced by the cover of his 1977 compilation album Guts, a compilation drawn from the Island trilogy after the label withheld Helen of Troy (1975) in the United States); this look predated the creation of Friday the 13ths villain, Jason Voorhees, by several years. During one concert in Croydon, south London, Cale chopped the head off a dead chicken with a meat cleaver, leading his band to walk offstage in protest. Cale's drummer – a vegetarian – was so bothered he quit the band. Cale mocks his decision on "Chicken Shit" from the Animal Justice EP. Cale has admitted that some of his paranoia and erratic behaviour at this time was associated with heavy cocaine use.

Also in 1977, Cale produced "I Don't Wanna", the debut single by punk rock band Sham 69.

In 1978, Cale produced the majority of Squeeze's debut studio album Squeeze, with Cale instructing the band to throw out all of the songs that the band had written up until that point, and to write new songs instead, with Glenn Tilbrook, and Chris Difford finding the process of working with Cale both frustrating and challenging. Also that year he played keyboards on Julie Covington's cover version of Alice Cooper's "Only Women Bleed", which peaked at No. 12 on the UK Singles Chart.

In 1979, he began a relationship with Austin, Texas-based groupie and journalist Margaret Moser. Cale named the group of women that Moser hung out with the Texas Blondes. His relationship with Moser lasted about five years, overlapping with the beginning of his third marriage.

In December 1979, Cale's embrace of the punk rock ethic that he helped to inspire culminated in the release of Sabotage/Live. This record, recorded live over three nights, at CBGB that June, features aggressive vocal and instrumental performances. The album consists entirely of new songs, many of which grapple confrontationally with global politics, militarism and paranoia.

Also in 1979, Cale played piano and the ARP synthesizer on the track "Bastard" by Ian Hunter of Mott the Hoople, on his fourth solo studio album You're Never Alone with a Schizophrenic.

The band included Deerfrance on vocals and percussion. An earlier live set, consisting mostly of new material, was recorded at CBGB the previous year. It was released in 1987 as Even Cowgirls Get the Blues. The band on that recording includes Ivan Král (best known for his work with Patti Smith) on bass and longtime Brian Eno associate Judy Nylon providing vocals, and narrating.

1980s

In 1980, Cale signed a recording contract with A&M Records and moved in a more commercial direction with his seventh solo studio album Honi Soit (1981). He worked with record producer Mike Thorne towards this end. Andy Warhol provided the cover art, in black and white, but against Warhol's wishes, Cale colourised it. The new direction did not succeed commercially, however, and his relationship with A&M ended. He signed with ZE Records, a company he had influenced the creation of and which had absorbed SPY Records, the label he had co-founded with Jane Friedman. In 1982, Cale released the sparse studio album Music for a New Society. Seeming to blend the refined music of his early solo work with the threatening music that came later, it is by any standard a bleak, harrowing record. It's been called "understated, and perhaps a masterpiece."

He followed it up with his ninth solo studio album Caribbean Sunset (1984), also on ZE Records. The album features contributions from Brian Eno and an otherwise "young unknown" band, that consisted of David Young on guitar, Andrew Heermans on bass guitar, and David Lichtenstein (son of artist Roy Lichtenstein) on drums. This work, with much more accessible production than on Music for a New Society (1982), was still extremely militant in some ways. However, it received negative reviews from critics, and has never been released on CD.

A live album, John Cale Comes Alive (1984), followed Caribbean Sunset and included two new studio songs, "Ooh La La" and "Never Give Up on You". Different mixes of the two studio tracks appeared on both sides of the Atlantic. During this period, Eden Cale was born to Cale and his third wife Risé Irushalmi in July 1985.

In a last-ditch attempt at commercial success, Cale recorded Artificial Intelligence (1985), his only studio album for Beggars Banquet Records. With all of its tracks written in collaboration with High Times and National Lampoon editor Larry "Ratso" Sloman (who had previously co-written two tracks on Caribbean Sunset), the album was a pop effort characterised by prominent use of synthesizers and drum machines. It was not significantly more successful than its predecessors, despite the relative success of the single "Satellite Walk". However, "Dying on the Vine" is generally regarded as one of Cale's best songs. That same year, he played a neo-Nazi organizer on an episode of The Equalizer, and wrote the music for a dramatization of the Kurt Vonnegut short story, Who Am I This Time? (1982), which aired on PBS and starred Christopher Walken and Susan Sarandon.

Cale again returned to record producing, producing Belgian pop singer Lio's third studio album Pop model (1986), and Happy Mondays's debut studio album, Squirrel and G-Man Twenty Four Hour Party People Plastic Face Carnt Smile (White Out) (1987). Other albums that he produced during this time were Element of Crime's second studio album Try to Be Mensch (1987), and Art Bergmann's debut solo studio album Crawl with Me (1988).

In part because of his young daughter, Cale took a long break from recording and performing. He made a comeback in 1989 with the Brian Eno-produced studio album Words for the Dying. The album consists mainly of oral work, read or sung by Cale. It was written in 1982 as a response to the Anglo-Argentinian Falklands War, using poems written by fellow Welshman Dylan Thomas. There are also two orchestral interludes, two other solo piano pieces "Songs Without Words", and finally a song by Cale, "The Soul of Carmen Miranda".

1990s
Following Warhol's death in 1987, Cale again collaborated with Lou Reed on the 1990 studio album Songs for Drella, a song cycle about Warhol, their mentor. The album marked an end to a 18-year estrangement from Reed. In his autobiography, Cale revealed that he resented letting Reed take charge of the project. The longstanding friction between Reed and Cale contributed to the passion and lurching frustration evident in the sound of the album, as did the ambivalent relationship Reed had to Warhol. Nevertheless, that same year, following a 20-year hiatus, the Velvet Underground reformed for a Fondation Cartier benefit show in Paris, France.

Cale again collaborated with Brian Eno, also in 1990, Wrong Way Up, a collaboration album characterised by an up-tempo accessibility at odds with Cale's description of the fraught relationship between the pair. The following year, Cale contributed a cover of "Hallelujah" to the Leonard Cohen tribute album I'm Your Fan. His mid-tempo, piano arrangement formed the basis of most subsequent cover versions of the song, which has since become a standard.

In 1996, Cale released Walking on Locusts which turned out to be his only solo studio album of the decade. The record featured appearances by Talking Heads' David Byrne, the Soldier String Quartet, and original Velvet Underground drummer Moe Tucker. Throughout the rest of the nineties, he worked primarily as a producer or contributor to other's recordings.

In 1992, he performed vocals on two songs, "Hunger" and "First Evening", on French composer and record producer Hector Zazou's concept album, Sahara Blue. All lyrics on the album were based on the poetry of Arthur Rimbaud. In 1994, Cale performed a spoken-word duet with Suzanne Vega on the song "The Long Voyage" on Zazou's studio album Chansons des mers froides. The lyrics were based on the poem "Les Silhouettes" by Oscar Wilde, and Cale co-wrote the music with Zazou. It was later released as a single (retitled "The Long Voyages" as it featured several remixes by Zazou, Mad Professor and more).

In 1995, Cale co-produced Siouxsie and the Banshees's eleventh and final studio album The Rapture, which included the single "O Baby". In 1996, he played piano on "Love to Die For" by Marc Almond of Soft Cell, from his ninth solo studio album Fantastic Star. He also produced Scottish alternative rock band Goya Dress's debut studio album Rooms.

Cale composed an instrumental score for a ballet titled Nico, performed by the Scapino Ballet in Rotterdam in October 1997 and was released as Dance Music (1998). Cale has written a number of film soundtracks, often using more classically influenced instrumentation.

In 1998, Cale mainly spent the year on tour with singer Siouxsie Sioux, formerly of Siouxsie and the Banshees. In February, he was the curator of one day festival called With a Little Help from My Friends that took place at the Paradiso in Amsterdam, Netherlands, with the presence of the Metropole Orchestra. The concert was shown on Dutch national television and featured a song specially composed for the event and still unreleased, "Murdering Mouth", sung in duet with Siouxsie and her second band the Creatures. Cale and Siouxsie then did a double bill tour in the US for two months from late June until mid-August, both artists collaborating on stage on several songs including a version of the Velvet Underground's "Venus in Furs".

Cale's autobiography, What's Welsh for Zen?, was written in collaboration with Victor Bockris and published in 1999 by Bloomsbury Publishing.

2000s

Cale recorded a cover version of "Hallelujah" by Leonard Cohen for the tribute album I'm Your Fan (1991). Cohen's original version of the song had not garnered much interest; it was only through Cale's arrangement and recording of it (and Jeff Buckley's subsequent cover of Cale's arrangement) that it achieved popularity. It was used in the 2001 computer-animated film Shrek, although it did not appear in the film's soundtrack due to licensing issues.

In 2002, Cale played piano and sang vocals on the track "Don't Pretend" by Gordon Gano of Violent Femmes, from his debut solo studio album Hitting the Ground.

Signing to EMI Records in 2003 with the EP 5 Tracks and studio album HoboSapiens, Cale again returned as a regular recording artist, this time with music influenced by modern electronica and alternative rock. The well-received album was co-produced with Nick Franglen of Lemon Jelly. It was followed by his 2005 studio album blackAcetate.

In 2005, Cale produced Austin singer-songwriter Alejandro Escovedo's eighth studio album, The Boxing Mirror, which was released in May 2006. In June 2006, Cale released a radio and digital single, "Jumbo in tha Modernworld", which was a standalone single. A music video was created for the song as well.

In February 2007, a 23-song live retrospective, Circus Live, was released in Europe. This two-disc album, composed of recordings from both the 2004 and 2006 tours, featured new arrangements and reworkings of songs from his entire career. Of particular interest is the Amsterdam Suite, a set of songs from a performance at the Amsterdam Paradiso in 2004. A studio-created drone has been edited into these songs. The set also included a DVD, featuring electric rehearsal material and a short acoustic set, as well as the video for "Jumbo in tha Modernworld", a 2006 single.

In May 2007, Cale contributed a cover version of the LCD Soundsystem song "All My Friends" to the vinyl and digital single releases of the LCD Soundsystem original. Cale has continued to work with other artists, contributing viola to Replica Sun Machine, the Danger Mouse-produced second studio album by London alternative pop trio the Shortwave Set and producing the second studio album of American indie band Ambulance LTD.

On 11 October 2008, Cale hosted an event to pay tribute to Nico called Life Along the Borderline in celebration of what, five days later, would have been her 70th birthday. The event was reprised at the Teatro Communale in Ferrara, Italy on 10 May 2009.

Cale represented Wales at the 2009 Venice Biennale exhibition, collaborating with artists, filmmakers, and poets, and focusing the artwork on his relationship with the Welsh language.

2010s
In January 2010, Cale was invited to be the first Eminent Art in Residence (EAR) at the Mona Foma festival curated by Brian Ritchie of Violent Femmes held in Hobart, Tasmania, Australia. His work for the 2009 Venice Biennale 'Dyddiau Du (dark days)' was shown at the festival, along with a number of live performances at venues around Hobart.

The Paris 1919 (1973) studio album was performed, in its entirety, at the Coal Exchange in Cardiff on 21 November 2009, at the Royal Festival Hall in London on 5 March 2010, and the Theatre Royal in Norwich on 14 May 2010. These performances were reprised in Paris, France, on 5 September 2010; Brescia, Italy, on 11 September 2010; Los Angeles, California, on 30 September 2010 at UCLA's Royce Hall; Melbourne, Australia, on 16 October 2010; Barcelona, Spain, on 28 May 2010 and Essen, Germany, on 6 October 2011.

In October 2010, Cale released the two-disc live album Live at Rockpalast, recorded during his two shows for German music television show Rockpalast on 14 October 1984 at Grugahalle, Essen (first disc; with full band) and 6 March 1983 at Zeche, Bochum (second disc; Cale solo with guitar and piano). This concert is missing "Risé, Sam and Rimsky-Korsakov" (Cale, Shepard) narrated by his then-wife Risé Irushalmi.

In February 2011, Cale signed a recording contract with Domino Records subsidiary Double Six and released an EP, Extra Playful, in September 2011.

In May 2011, he and his band appeared at the Brighton Festival, performing songs to the theme of Émigré/Lost & Found. Cale appeared at the invitation of the Nobel Peace Prize winner Aung San Suu Kyi, who was the festival's guest director.

In the autumn of 2012, Cale released Shifty Adventures in Nookie Wood, his first studio album since 2005. The album features a collaboration with Danger Mouse, "I Wanna Talk 2 U". Critical reception of the album was mixed to positive, with The Guardian newspaper describing it as "an album that combines the 70-year-old's experience with the glee of a small child."

In 2014, he appeared as vendor in an episode "Sorrowsworn" of the crime drama television series The Bridge.

Cale released his sixteenth solo studio album M:FANS in January 2016. It features new versions of songs from his 1982 album Music for a New Society.

In July 2016, Cale performed the songs "Valentine's Day", "Sorrow" and "Space Oddity" at a late-night BBC Prom concert at the Royal Albert Hall in London, celebrating the music of David Bowie who had died earlier that year.

At the 2017 Grammy Salute to Music Legends ceremony, Cale performed with, amongst others, Moe Tucker, two Velvet Underground classics, "Sunday Morning" and "I'm Waiting for the Man". The Velvet Underground were also the recipients of the 2017 Merit Award.

In February 2019, Cale collaborated with Marissa Nadler on her new single "Poison".

In September 2019, he gives three concerts titled 2019–1964: Futurespective at the Paris' Philharmonie, inviting his compatriot Cate Le Bon to join the band.

2020s
Cale features on the track "Corner of My Sky" from Welsh electronic musician Kelly Lee Owens' second studio album Inner Song (2020).

On 6 October 2020, Cale released a new track and accompanying music video called "Lazy Day".

In February 2022, Cale announced his first full UK tour in almost a decade. Cale's tour was to begin in Liverpool at the Philharmonic Hall on July 15, before calling at Whitley Bay, York, Bexhill, Cambridge and the London Palladium, before closing out the run at Birmingham Town Hall on July 25. However, the tour was postponed to the fall of 2022 because some
bandmembers contracted COVID-19.

In August 2022 Cale released the new track "Night Crawling", accompanied by an official animated music video by Mickey Miles. The song is a reminiscence about his friendship with David Bowie who had died in 2016. "It's been a helluva past two years and I’m glad to finally share a glimpse of what’s coming ahead," Cale said in a statement. "There was this period around mid-late Seventies when David and I would run into each other in New York. There was plenty of talk about getting some work done but of course we’d end up running the streets, sometimes until we couldn’t keep a thought in our heads, let alone actually get a song together!" Cale played synthesizers, bass guitar, piano and drums on the track assisted by Mars Volta drummer Deantoni Parks and guitarist Dustin Boyer. On 19 October 2022, Cale released another track, titled "Story of Blood", featuring American chamber pop singer Weyes Blood. "Noise of You" was released as the third track on 11 January 2023. All tracks are from his seventeenth studio album Mercy. The album was released on 20 January 2023.

Honours and legacy
Cale was inducted into the Rock and Roll Hall of Fame as a member of the Velvet Underground in 1996. At the ceremony, Cale, Reed, and Tucker performed a song titled "Last Night I Said Goodbye to My Friend", dedicated to Sterling Morrison, who had died the previous August.

Cale was appointed Officer of the Order of the British Empire (OBE) in the 2010 Birthday Honours for services to Music and to the Arts.

Personal life
Cale married American fashion designer Betsey Johnson in 1968. The couple divorced in 1971 having been married three years.

In 1971, Cale met Cynthia "Cindy" Wells, better known as Miss Cinderella or Miss Cindy of the GTOs, and they married soon afterward. Their marriage was rocky and they divorced in 1975.

On 6 December 1981, Cale married his third wife, Risé Irushalmi. They had one daughter together, Eden Cale. They divorced in 1997.

For his 2004 appearance on BBC Radio 4's Desert Island Discs Cale chose "She Belongs to Me" by Bob Dylan as his favourite track; he also selected  Repetition (2001) by Alain Robbe-Grillet as his chosen book and an espresso coffee machine as his luxury item.

Substance abuse
As a child, Cale suffered from severe bronchial issues, which led to a doctor prescribing him opiates. He would come to rely on the drug in order to fall asleep. Biographer Tim Mitchell claims Cale's early dependence on medicine was a "formative experience". Cale later told an interviewer that, "When I got to New York, drugs were everywhere, and they quickly became part of my artistic experiment".

He was heavily involved in New York City's drug scene of the 1960s and 1970s, with cocaine as his drug of choice. He is said to have "taken most of the available drugs in the United States." Cale has said that, "In the '60s, for me, drugs were a cool experiment... In the '70s, I got in over my head."

Cale feels his drug addiction negatively affected his music during the 1980s. He decided to clean up following a series of embarrassing concerts and the birth of his daughter. According to a 2009 BBC interview, the "strongest drug" he was then taking was coffee. Cale has also hosted a documentary called Heroin, Wales and Me (2009) to promote awareness of the problems of heroin addiction, easy availability and low cost of the drug in his native Wales and thousands of addicts.

Discography

 Studio albums Vintage Violence (1970)
 The Academy in Peril (1972)
 Paris 1919 (1973)
 Fear (1974)
 Slow Dazzle (1975)
 Helen of Troy (1975)
 Honi Soit (1981)
 Music for a New Society (1982)
 Caribbean Sunset (1984)
 Artificial Intelligence (1985)
 Words for the Dying (1989)
 Walking on Locusts (1996)
 HoboSapiens (2003)
 blackAcetate (2005)
 Shifty Adventures in Nookie Wood (2012)
 M:FANS (2016)
 Mercy (2023)

 Live albums June 1, 1974 (with Kevin Ayers, Brian Eno, Nico) 1974
 Sabotage/Live (1979)
 John Cale Comes Alive (1984)
 Even Cowgirls Get the Blues (1991)
 Fragments of a Rainy Season (1992)
 Circus Live (2007)
 Live at Rockpalast (2010)

 Collaborative albums Church of Anthrax (1971) (with Terry Riley)
 Songs for Drella (1990) (with Lou Reed)
 Wrong Way Up (1990) (with Brian Eno)
 Last Day on Earth (1994) (with Bob Neuwirth)

 Soundtracks and scores'''
 Straight and Narrow (Short) (1970)
 Women in Revolt (1971)
 Heat (1972)
 Caged Heat (1974)
 American Playhouse (TV Series) (1 episode)- Who Am I This Time? (1982)
 Something Wild (1986)
 The Houseguest (short) (1989)
 Dick: A Film by Jo Menell (Documentary short) (1989)
 Songs for Drella (Video) (1990)
 Paris Awakens (1991)
 Healing Hurts (1991)
 Primary Motive (1992)
 The Birth of Love  (1993)
 Life Underwater (1994)
 Ah Pook Is Here (short) (1994)
 Don't Forget You're Going to Die/N'oublie pas que tu vas mourir (1995)
 Antarctica (1995)
 I Shot Andy Warhol (1996)
 Basquiat (1996)
 Rhinoceros Hunting in Budapest (1997)
 Somewhere in the City (1998)
 Night Wind (1999)
 Wisconsin Death Trip (1999)
 The Virgin (1999)
 American Psycho (2000)
 Love Me (2000)
 The King's Daughters / Saint-Cyr (2000)
 The Farewell: Brecht's Last Summer (2000)
 Y Mabinogi / Otherworld (2003)
 New Scenes from America (2003)
 Paris (2003)
 Process (2004)
 About Face: The Story of the Jewish Refugee Soldiers of World War II (2005)
 A Burning Hot Summer (2011)
 Of Women and Horses (2011)
 Paul Sanchez Is Back! (2018)

References

Sources
 
 The New Musical Express Book of Rock'', 1975, Star Books;

External links

 
 
 
 

 
1942 births
21st-century organists
Living people
People from Garnant
Alumni of Goldsmiths, University of London
British experimental musicians
British rock violists
Officers of the Order of the British Empire
Protopunk musicians
ROIR artists
The Velvet Underground members
Welsh male singers
Welsh multi-instrumentalists
Welsh pianists
Welsh record producers
Welsh rock bass guitarists
Welsh rock musicians
Welsh rock singers
Welsh singer-songwriters
Welsh songwriters
Welsh expatriates in the United States
Welsh keyboardists
Welsh artists
Welsh classical violists
Welsh classical pianists
Male classical pianists
Welsh organists
British male organists
Island Records artists
Double Six Records artists
All Saints Records artists
Welsh violists
Beggars Banquet Records artists
I.R.S. Records artists
Reprise Records artists
Art rock musicians
Pupils of Cornelius Cardew
Columbia Records artists
A&M Records artists
Pupils of La Monte Young
People associated with The Factory
British male pianists
Male bass guitarists
Welsh-language singers
Welsh-speaking musicians
Welsh contemporary artists
ZE Records artists